The 2015–16 Vermont Catamounts women's basketball team will represent the University of Vermont in the America East Conference. The Catamounts, led by sixth year head coach Lori Gear McBride and play their home games in the Patrick Gym. They finished the season 9–21, 4–12 in America East play to finish in eighth place. They lost in the quarterfinals of the America East women's tournament to Albany.

On March 25, Lori Gear McBride was fired. She finished at Vermont with a 6-year record of 46–134.

Media
All non-televised home games and conference road games will stream on either ESPN3 or AmericaEast.tv. Select home games will be televised by the Northeast Sports Network. Most road games will stream on the opponents website. All games will be broadcast on WVMT 620 AM and streamed online through SportsJuice.com with Rob Ryan calling the action.

Roster

Schedule

|-
!colspan=12 style="background:#008000; color:#FFD700;"| Exhibition

|-
!colspan=12 style="background:#008000; color:#FFD700;"| Non-conference regular season

|-
!colspan=12 style="background:#008000; color:#FFD700;"| America East regular season

|-
!colspan=12 style="background:#008000; color:#FFD700;"| America East Women's Tournament

See also
 2015–16 Vermont Catamounts men's basketball team

References

Vermont
Vermont Catamounts women's basketball seasons
2015 in sports in Vermont
2016 in sports in Vermont